H.W. Butterworth and Sons Company Building, now known as 2424 Studios, is a historic factory building located in the Kensington neighborhood of Philadelphia, Pennsylvania. It was built in five phases between 1870 and about 1925.  The three earliest sections are in the Italianate style. The complex ranges from one to three-stories, and is constructed of brick and reinforced concrete.  The H.W. Butterworth and Sons Company manufactured textile machinery, then during World War II built anti-aircraft machine gun parts.

It was added to the National Register of Historic Places in 2010 and was converted into studios in 2011.

References

External links 
 2424 Studios web site

Industrial buildings and structures on the National Register of Historic Places in Philadelphia
Italianate architecture in Pennsylvania
Industrial buildings completed in 1925
Kensington, Philadelphia
Textile machinery manufacturers of the United States